Ghilăuca may refer to the following rivers in Romania:

 Ghilăuca, a tributary of the Ibăneasa in Botoșani County
 Ghilăuca, a tributary of the Putreda in Botoșani County